The 1989 Southern Conference men's basketball tournament took place from March 3–5, 1989 at the Asheville Civic Center in Asheville, North Carolina. The East Tennessee State Buccaneers, led by head coach Les Robinson, won their first Southern Conference title and received the automatic berth to the 1989 NCAA tournament.

Format
All of the conference's eight members were eligible for the tournament. Teams were seeded based on conference winning percentage. The tournament used a preset bracket consisting of three rounds.

Bracket

* Overtime game

See also
List of Southern Conference men's basketball champions

References

Tournament
Southern Conference men's basketball tournament
Southern Conference men's basketball tournament
Southern Conference men's basketball tournament
Basketball competitions in Asheville, North Carolina
College sports tournaments in North Carolina
College basketball in North Carolina